Innamorata is a 2014 Philippine television drama romantic fantasy series broadcast by GMA Network. It premiered on the network's Afternoon Prime line up from February 17, 2014 to June 20, 2014, replacing Magkano Ba ang Pag-ibig?.

Mega Manila ratings are provided by AGB Nielsen Philippines.

Series overview

Episodes

February 2014

March 2014

April 2014

May 2014

June 2014

References

Lists of Philippine drama television series episodes